The Deposition from the Cross is an altarpiece, completed in 1528, depicting the Deposition of Christ by the Italian Renaissance painter Jacopo Pontormo. It is broadly considered to be the artist's surviving masterpiece. Painted in oil on canvas, the painting is located above the altar of the Capponi Chapel of the church of Santa Felicita in Florence.

Interpretation
This painting suggests a whirling dance of the grief-stricken. They inhabit a flattened space, comprising a sculptural congregation of brightly demarcated colors. The vortex of the composition droops down towards the limp body of Jesus off center in the left. Those lowering Christ appear to demand our help in sustaining  both the weight of his body (and the burden of sin Christ took on) and their grief. No Cross is visible; the natural world itself also appears to have nearly vanished: a lonely cloud and a shadowed patch of ground with a crumpled sheet provide sky and stratum for the mourners.  If the sky and earth have lost color, the mourners have not; bright swathes of pink and blue envelop the pallid, limp Christ. 

Pontormo's undulating mannerist contortions have been interpreted as intending to express apoplectic and uncontrolled spasms of melancholy. The Virgin, larger than her counterparts, swoons sideways inviting the support of those behind her; the Swoon of the Virgin was a controversial moment at the time. The assembly looks completely interlocked, as if architecturally integrated. Legend has it that Pontormo set himself in self-portrait at the extreme right of the canvas; but ultimately, the most compelling and empathic figure is the crouching man in the foreground, whose expression mixes the weight of the cadaver and the weight of melancholy.

Other works
The Deposition from the Cross is one of the standard scenes from the life of Jesus in medieval art, and because of the complexities of the composition, it is one in which Renaissance artists continued to take a great interest.  Several years prior to Pontormo's masterpiece, the Florentine painter Rosso Fiorentino had painted a more phantasmagorical and gymnastically challenged array in his crowded version of the descent from the cross of 1521.

Pontormo's grieving crowds and brightness of color also provide a stark contrast to Caravaggio's somber Deposition from the Cross or Entombment in the Vatican Pinacoteca. The Deposition by Raphael in the Galleria Borghese shows a later, though related scene: the Entombment of Christ.

In addition to works of the same subject by other artists, Pontormo's own work from the time provides a useful comparison.  The decoration in the dome of the Capponi chapel is now lost, but four roundels with the Evangelists still adorn the pendentives, which were painted  by both Pontormo and his apprentice Bronzino. The swathed drapery in The Visitation (1529) in the church of San Michele e Francesco at Carmignano bears a striking resemblance to that in the Deposition. The contrapposto of the figures can be compared to Pontormo's Annunciation (1520s) frescoed on the adjacent wall.

References

External links
The Metropolitan Museum of Art 
Louis Alexander Waldman, "New light on the Capponi Chapel in S. Felicita," The Art Bulletin,  June, 2002 

Paintings by Pontormo
1528 paintings
Pontormo
Paintings of the Virgin Mary
Altarpieces